First Lieutenant Frank G. Butterfield (May 11, 1842 – January 6, 1916) was an American soldier who fought in the American Civil War. Butterfield received the country's highest award for bravery during combat, the Medal of Honor, for his action  at Salem Heights, Virginia on May 4, 1863. He was honored with the award on May 4, 1891.

Biography
Butterfield was born on May 11, 1842, in Rockingham, Vermont, and was pursuing law at the Middlebury College before the outbreak of the war. He enlisted into the 6th Vermont Infantry on October 4, 1861, at Middlebury. He earned the Medal of Honor for his actions at Salem Heights on May 4, 1863. He was later promoted to lieutenant-colonel on command of his regiment on October 21, 1864.

Following the war he was a merchant operating on the Saxtons River and subsequently returned to school to complete his law qualifications. In 1880 and 1881 he was in charge of the tenth Vermont census, he led investigations into alleged census fraud in South Carolina and also assisted with the tenth Washington census. He then transferred to the Bureau of Pensions in 1882 and became chief of the special examination division in 1890. He resigned from public office in 1888 to pursue private business.

Butterfield died on January 6, 1916, at the age of 73 and would be buried in the Saxtons River Cemetery in Saxtons River, Vermont.

Medal of Honor citation

See also

List of American Civil War Medal of Honor recipients: A–F

References

External links

See also

1842 births
1916 deaths
People of West Virginia in the American Civil War
Union Army officers
United States Army Medal of Honor recipients
American Civil War recipients of the Medal of Honor